The 2007 Hong Kong Super Series is the last tournament of the 2007 BWF Super Series in badminton before the Super Series Final. It was held in Ma On Shan for qualifying tournament and Wan Chai for main tournament, in Hong Kong from 26 November to 2 December 2007.

Men's singles

Seeds
 Lin Dan
 Lee Chong Wei
 Bao Chunlai
 Chen Jin
 Peter Gade
 Taufik Hidayat
 Sony Dwi Kuncoro
 Kenneth Jonassen

Results

Women's singles

Seeds
 Xie Xingfang
 Zhang Ning
 Zhu Lin
 Lu Lan
 Pi Hongyan
 Wang Chen
 Xu Huaiwen
 Wong Mew Choo

Results

Men's doubles

Seeds
 Koo Kien Keat / Tan Boon Heong
 Fu Haifeng / Cai Yun
 Markis Kido / Hendra Setiawan
 Jung Jae-sung / Lee Yong-dae
 Choong Tan Fook / Lee Wan Wah
 Candra Wijaya /  Tony Gunawan
 Jens Eriksen / Martin Lundgaard Hansen
 Lee Jae-jin / Hwang Ji-man

Results

Women's doubles

Seeds
 Zhang Yawen / Wei Yili
 Yang Wei / Zhang Jiewen
 Lee Kyung-won / Lee Hyo-jung
 Chien Yu Chin / Cheng Wen-Hsing
 Gao Ling / Zhao Tingting
 Kumiko Ogura / Reiko Shiota
 Gail Emms / Donna Kellogg
 Wong Pei Tty / Chin Eei Hui

Results

Mixed doubles

Seeds
 Zheng Bo / Gao Ling
 Nova Widianto / Lilyana Natsir
 Xie Zhongbo / Zhang Yawen
 Flandy Limpele / Vita Marissa
 Nathan Robertson / Gail Emms
 Thomas Laybourn / Kamilla Rytter Juhl
 Anthony Clark / Donna Kellogg

Results

External links
Tournamentsoftware.com: Hong Kong Super Series 2007

H
Hong Kong Open (badminton)
Hong Kong